Blastobasis ergastulella is a moth in the  family Blastobasidae. It was described by Zeller in 1877. It is found in Colombia.

References

Natural History Museum Lepidoptera generic names catalog

Blastobasis
Moths described in 1877